The Sharif Group of Companies is a Pakistani agricultural conglomerate company based in Lahore, Pakistan. It was established in 1974 by Pakistani businessman Mian Muhammad Sharif.

The Sharif Group assets are valued at US $300 million approximately.

Subsidiaries 
Subsidiaries of Sharif Group are:

Ramzan Sugar Mills

Sharif Feed
The feed operates on 25 acres of land. It is one of the major players in Pakistani bird feed industry.

Ramzan Sugar Cane Development Farm
It was established in 2005 and is currently directed by Suleman Shehbaz Sharif. To develop sugar cane, 600 acres of land was acquired by the group.

See also 
 Ittefaq Group
 List of companies of Pakistan

References

External links 
 Sharif Group 

Conglomerate companies of Pakistan
Companies based in Lahore
Pakistani companies established in 1974
Food and drink companies established in 1974